The men's 50 kilometres race walk at the 1950 European Athletics Championships was held in Brussels, Belgium, on 25 August 1950.

Medalists

Results

Final
25 August

Participation
According to an unofficial count, 17 athletes from 10 countries participated in the event.

 (2)
 (1)
 (1)
 (2)
 (2)
 (1)
 (2)
 (2)
 (2)
 (2)

References

50 kilometres race walk
Racewalking at the European Athletics Championships